Gaar, Scott & Co., was an American threshing machine and steam traction engine builder founded in 1849 and based in  Richmond, Indiana. The company built simple and compound engines in sizes from 10 to 50 horsepower. Farm machinery produced by the firm were advertised as part of "the Tiger Line" and used a tiger upon two globes as the company logo.  In the Fall of 1869, A. Gaar & Co. won "Best Portable Farm Steam Engine" and "Best Eight Horse Power" at the 17th Illinois State Fair, for which it won two Silver Medal prizes.  It merged with the M. Rumley Co. in 1911 during a purchasing frenzy that put the later firm into insolvency.  The company was reorganized as Advance-Rumely Thresher Company Inc.  Advance-Rumely Thresher Company was later purchased by Allis-Chalmers Mfg. Co.

The Abram Gaar House and Farm is listed on the National Register of Historic Places and open as a historic house museum.  The Gaar-Scott office building, designed by noted architect John A. Hasecoster, still stands in Richmond and is the headquarters of Richmond Baking, a large commercial baker.

References

External links
Restoration of one of the two remaining 40hp Gaar-Scott traction engines

Agricultural machinery manufacturers of the United States
Richmond, Indiana
Defunct companies based in Indiana
Steam engine manufacturers
1849 establishments in Indiana
1911 disestablishments in Indiana
Manufacturing companies established in 1849
Manufacturing companies disestablished in 1911
Allis-Chalmers Manufacturing Company